Halla University is a private Korean University created in 1995 and located in Wonju.

External links
Official web site

Educational institutions established in 1995
Universities and colleges in Gangwon Province, South Korea
Education in Wonju
1995 establishments in South Korea